Wisdom of the Pretzel (original Hebrew title: Hochmat HaBeygale) is a 2002 Israeli comedy film directed by Ilan Heitner. Wisdom of the Pretzel is a film adaptation of a best-selling Israeli novel.

Plot
The main character, Golan, is a 20 something year old student nearing the end of his college studies, and is having a hard time deciding about his future. He sees no point in getting a job, finding a wife or stopping the endless round of parties. After a blind date with his best friend's quirky sister, he begins to question his life. Golan then begins a personal journey that has him challenge everything he has ever believed, about himself, about love and about the nature of life in contemporary Israel.

Cast & reception
The film features Guy Loel, Osnat Hakim, Yoram Zacs, Beni Avni, Shai Werker, and Orit Sher.

Wisdom of the Pretzel was nominated for nine Israeli Film Academy Awards.

References

External links

 
Hebrew Site

2002 comedy films
2002 films
2000s Hebrew-language films
Israeli comedy films
Films set in Tel Aviv
Films based on Israeli novels